Thomas Reinmann (born 9 April 1983 in Langenthal) is a Swiss football defender who currently works for FC Herzogenbuchsee as a player-coach.

International career
Reinmann has represented Switzerland at every level between Under 15 and Under 20.

References

External links
FC Vaduz profile

1983 births
Living people
Swiss men's footballers
Swiss Super League players
FC Baden players
FC Vaduz players
Swiss expatriate footballers
Swiss expatriate sportspeople in Liechtenstein
FC Thun players
Swiss expatriates in Liechtenstein
Expatriate footballers in Liechtenstein
People from Langenthal
Association football defenders
Sportspeople from the canton of Bern